Critical Arts is a peer-reviewed academic journal publishing articles which examine how disciplines represented by cultural and media studies think about themselves in terms of critical dialogues generated within the South-North relationship, with special reference to Africa. It was established in 1980 and is published by Routledge and UNISA Press.

Abstracting and indexing 
The journal is abstracted and indexed in:

External links 
 

Taylor & Francis academic journals
English-language journals
Cultural journals
Publications established in 1980
5 times per year journals